Cnephasia bizensis is a species of moth of the family Tortricidae. It is found in France, Italy and possibly Spain.

The wingspan is 17–21 mm. The ground colour of the forewings is very pale grey with a yellowish hue, with traces of a faintly marked medial band. The hindwings are yellowish grey, but darker on the periphery. Adults have been recorded on wing at the end of April and in June.

References

Moths described in 1953
bizensis